The 2014 Generali Ladies Linz was a tennis tournament played on indoor hard courts. It was the 28th edition of the Generali Ladies Linz, and part of the WTA International tournaments-category of the 2014 WTA Tour. It was held at the TipsArena Linz in Linz, Austria, on 6–12 October 2014.

Points and prize money

Point distribution

Prize money

1 Qualifiers prize money is also the Round of 32 prize money
* per team

Singles entrants

Seeds 

 Rankings as of September 29, 2014

Other entrants 
The following players received wildcards into the singles main draw:
  Sabine Lisicki
  Patricia Mayr-Achleitner
  Lisa-Maria Moser

The following players received entry from the qualifying draw:
  Madison Brengle
  Anna-Lena Friedsam
  Ons Jabeur
  Kateřina Siniaková

The following player received entry as a lucky loser:
  Kiki Bertens

Withdrawals 
Before the tournament
  Petra Cetkovská
  Lucie Šafářová
  Carla Suárez Navarro (right elbow injury)
  Elena Vesnina
During the tournament
  Eugenie Bouchard (left thigh injury)
  Ana Ivanovic (hip injury)

Retirements
  Irina-Camelia Begu (viral illness)
  Magdaléna Rybáriková (left hip strain)

Doubles entrants

Seeds 

1 Rankings as of September 29, 2014

Other entrants 
The following pairs received wildcards into the doubles main draw:
  Barbara Haas /  Patricia Mayr-Achleitner
  Sandra Klemenschits /  Tamira Paszek

Champions

Singles 

 Karolína Plíšková def.  Camila Giorgi,  6–7(4–7), 6–3, 7–6(7–4)

Doubles 

 Raluca Olaru /  Anna Tatishvili def.  Annika Beck /  Caroline Garcia, 6–2, 6–1

External links 
 

2014 WTA Tour
2013
Generali Ladies Linz
October 2014 sports events in Europe
Generali